This is the discography for Meat Beat Manifesto.

Albums

Studio albums
1989 Storm the Studio
1990 Armed Audio Warfare
1990 99%
1992 Satyricon
1996 Subliminal Sandwich
1998 Actual Sounds + Voices
2002 RUOK?
2005 At The Center
2008 Autoimmune
2010 Answers Come in Dreams
2018 Impossible Star
2019 Opaque Couché

Remix albums
2003 Storm The Studio RMXS
2004 ...In Dub

Live albums
2006 Live '05

Compilation
1997 Original Fire
2007 Archive Things 1982-88

EPs & singles
1987   Suck Hard (limited release of 1500 copies on vinyl)
A1 "I Got The Fear" (4:59) 	
B1 "Kick That Man" (5:26)
B2 "Kneel And Buzz" (4:33)
B3 Untitled (0:42)
1988   I Got The Fear
1988   Strap Down
1988   God O.D.
1990   Dog Star Man
1990   Helter Skelter/Radio Babylon
1990   Psyche Out
1991   Version Galore
1991   Now
1992   Edge of No Control
1993   Mindstream
1993   Peel Session
1993   Australian Tour EP
1996   Transmission
1996   Asbestos Lead Asbestos
1996   It's The Music
1997   Original Fire
1998   Acid Again
1998   Prime Audio Soup
2000   Eccentric Objects
2002   What Does It All Mean?
2004   Battersea Shield
2004   Echo In Space Dub / Retrograde Pt. 2 Dub We R 1
2005   Radio Free Republic/Lovefingers
2005   Off-Centre
2008   Guns N Lovers
2008   Lonely Soldier
2008   Tour 2008 EP
2010   Totally Together
2012   Test EP
2015   2.2 (Kasm02)
2016   2016 Tour EP
2019   Pin Drop / No Design

Video releases
2004   ...In Dub
2006   Travelogue Live '05

Compilation appearances
1991 Volume (magazine) - Volume One - "Love Mad"
1995 Survival 2000 - "Simulacra Part 2"
1995 Trance Atlantic - "Simulacra Part 1"
1995 EBN - telecommunication breakdown - production, manipulation by Jack dangers (TVT 4710 2) (enhanced w/ floppy disc)
1996 FMCD 44 - "Electric People (Jack Dangers Remix)"
1996 Volume (magazine) - Volume Sixteen - "Future Worlds (Alternative Version)"
1996 In Defense of Animals Volume 2 - "We Done It Again"
1996 Offbeat: A Red Hot Soundtrip - "I Control (Audio Collage #2)"
1997 Plastic Compilation Volume 1 - "She's Unreal (Alternate Mix 3)"
1998 For the Masses - "Everything Counts"
1999 Convergence (Where Live Meets Electronic) - "Source of Uncertainty: 1996"
1999 Hot Wheels Turbo Racing "Original Game Soundtrack" - "Eclectic People"
1999 Earth Dance - "Anon"
2000 Better Living Through Circuitry - "Parts 1-4"
2003 The Animatrix: The Album - "Martenot Waves"
2004 Moog Original Film Soundtrack	- "Unavailable Memory"
2005 Destroy All Humans! Soundtrack - "Mind Over Matter" and "We Shall Destroy You"
2006 Underworld: Evolution Soundtrack - "Suicide"
2008 Rebirth 1.0 - "The Unprintable Word"
2008 Brainwaves 2008 - "Reanimator pts. 5-8", "Apathetic Sympathetic"
2016 Cold Waves V - "Falling Upright (Acucrack Tough N Ruthless Remix)"
2018 Cold Waves VII - "Brain Wrong"
2020 Cold Waves 2020 - "Distorted Information"

Music videos
1989   I Got The Fear
1989   Strap Down
1990   99%
1990   Psyche Out
1992   Edge of No Control
1992   Mindstream
1996   Asbestos Lead Asbestos
1997   Helter Skelter '97
1998   Prime Audio Soup

Selected remixes
 Atomic Babies "Cetch Da' Monkey"
 Boom Boom Satellites "4 a Moment of Silence"
 Banco de Gaia "How Much Reality Can You Take"
 Bush "Insect Kin"
 Consolidated "Butyric Acid"
 David Bowie "Pallas Athena"
 Deepsky "Stargazer"
 Depeche Mode "Rush"
 Excepter "Kill People"
 D.H.S. "House of God"
 Empirion "Narcotic Influence"
 God Lives Underwater "Rearrange" (Example 1 + 2)
 MC 900 Ft. Jesus "Killer Inside Me"
 Nine Inch Nails "Closer (Deviation)"
 Nine Inch Nails "The Perfect Drug"
 Orbital "Oolaa"
 Scorn "Silver Rain Fell"
 The Shamen "Ebeneezer Goode", "Hyperreal"
 The Young Gods "Kissing the Sun"
 Tower of Power "What Is Hip"
 Twilight Circus Dub Sound System "Highway"

External links
Meat Beat Manifesto Discography on Discogs
Official Meat Beat Manifesto Site

Pop music group discographies
Discographies of British artists